Freemason Street Baptist Church is a historic Baptist church located at Norfolk, Virginia. It was designed by architect Thomas Ustick Walter and dedicated in 1850.  It is a one-story, Perpendicular Gothic style stuccoed brick church.  The front facade features a projecting belfry and two stage tower topped by an octagonal spire.

It was listed on the National Register of Historic Places in 1971.

References

External links
Freemason Street Baptist Church website

19th-century Baptist churches in the United States
Baptist churches in Virginia
Churches on the National Register of Historic Places in Virginia
Gothic Revival church buildings in Virginia
Churches completed in 1850
Churches in Norfolk, Virginia
National Register of Historic Places in Norfolk, Virginia